Emile Gerardus Maria Roemer (born 24 August 1962) is a Dutch politician serving as King's Commissioner of Limburg since December 2021. A member of the Socialist Party (SP), he was its leader and parliamentary leader in the House of Representatives from 5 March 2010 until 13 December 2017. Roemer served as a member of the House of Representatives from 2006 until 2018, as acting Mayor of Heerlen from 2018 to 2020, and as acting mayor of Alkmaar from 2020 to 2021.

Biography

Early life
Roemer was the fourth in a family of five children. His father was the head of department for an unknown company.

After finishing high school, Roemer studied to be an elementary school teacher. From 1986 until 1992, he was a teacher at an elementary school in Beuningen called 't Schrijverke. From 1992 until 2002, he was a teacher at an elementary school called De Peppels, located in his hometown Boxmeer.

Politics
In 1994 he was elected to the municipal council of Boxmeer; in 2002 he became the alderman in the municipal executive for finance. From 1980 until 2007 he was chairman of the Socialist Party in Boxmeer. In the 2006 general election, he was elected as a member of the House of Representatives for the Socialist Party. On 5 March 2010 he was elected the new party leader following the resignation of Agnes Kant. On 13 March 2010 he was elected as the SP lijsttrekker (top candidate) for the upcoming general election. He was again lijsttrekker in 2012 and 2017.

In 2018, he became Acting Mayor of Heerlen. In 2020, he became Acting Mayor of Alkmaar.

On 1 December 2021 he was installed as the new governor of the province of Limburg.

Personal life
Roemer has been married to Aimée Roemer since 1986. They have two daughters together.

References

External links
Official

  E.G.M. (Emile) Roemer Parlement & Politiek
  Emile Roemer Tweede Kamer der Staten-Generaal

|-

1962 births
Living people
Aldermen in North Brabant
Dutch anti-poverty advocates
Dutch schoolteachers
King's and Queen's Commissioners of Limburg
Leaders of the Socialist Party (Netherlands)
Mayors of Alkmaar
Mayors of Heerlen
Members of the House of Representatives (Netherlands)
Municipal councillors of Boxmeer
People from Boxmeer
Socialist Party (Netherlands) politicians
20th-century Dutch politicians
21st-century Dutch politicians